A waste collector, also known as a garbageman, garbage collector, trashman (in the US), binman or (rarely) dustman (in the UK), is a person employed by a public or private enterprise to collect and dispose of municipal solid waste (refuse) and recyclables from residential, commercial, industrial or other collection sites for further processing and waste disposal. Specialised waste collection vehicles (also known as garbage trucks in the US, bin lorries in the UK) featuring an array of automated functions are often deployed to assist waste collectors in reducing collection and transport time and for protection from exposure. Waste and recycling pickup work is physically demanding and usually exposes workers to an occupational hazard.

The first known waste collectors were said to come from Britain in the 1350s, coinciding with the Black Plague and were called "rakers."

A related occupation is that of a sanitation worker who operates and maintains sanitation technology.

Health and safety hazards
Statistics show that waste collection is one of the most dangerous jobs, at times more dangerous than police work, but consistently less dangerous than commercial fishing and ranch and farm work. On-the-job hazards include broken glass, medical waste such as syringes, caustic chemicals, objects falling out of overloaded containers, diseases that may accompany solid waste, asbestos, dog attacks and pests, inhaling dust, smoke and chemical fumes, severe weather, traffic accidents, and unpleasant smells that can make someone physically sick.

Society and culture

Regional names 
Many varieties of English have a range of names for waste collectors, from formal job titles for municipal employees, to colloquial and regional terms.

People

Former waste collectors
Georges St-Pierremixed martial artist and UFC Welterweight Champion, (worked as a garbage man for 6 months).

Fictional waste collectors
The films Blood Feast, Scanners III: The Takeover and Child's Play 3 all feature minor characters being murdered with refuse trucks.
Lala Hagoromo from the 2019 anime Star Twinkle PreCure collected trash for a living due to her poor skills assessment before becoming Cure Milky.

See also
 Beach cleaner
 Rag-and-bone man
 Curbside collection
 Fecal sludge management
 Litter
 Memphis sanitation strike, USA, 1968
 Waste management
 Waste picker

Notes

References

Further reading

Cleaning and maintenance occupations